Musso is a small town in the Province of Como in the Italian region Lombardy. It borders the communes of Dongo to the north, Pianello del Lario to the south and Colico across the lake in the Province of Lecco.

The commune is a member of the Comunità Montana Alto Lario Occidentale.

Main sights
The castle, which dates back to the fourteenth century, was the power-base of Gian Giacomo Medici (‘il Medeghino’), brother of Pope Pius IV, and variously known as “pirate, king, brigand, traitor, rebel, assassin and hero”. During the years 1522 to 1532 he acquired control over much of the lake and parts of Brianza. He was finally defeated by the combined forces of the Duke of Milan Francesco II Sforza, the Swiss Confederacy and the Grisons.

Notes

References
.

.
.

Cities and towns in Lombardy